Hanifa Deen is an Australian writer, of Pakistani ancestry. She won the New South Wales Premier's Literary Awards — Ethnic Affairs Commission Award in 1996, and her book, The Jihad Seminar, was short-listed for the 2008 Human Rights Awards — Literature Non-Fiction Award.

Biography
She has described how one of her grandfathers was a Kashmiri who jumped ship in Melbourne, while the other was a Punjabi small business man who came in the wake of the Afghan camel drivers, who helped to facilitate access to the Australian interior.

Her non-fiction books have focused on issues concerning Muslims. Her first book, Caravanserai, portrayed the lives of Australian Muslims. Her second book, Broken Bangles, focused on Muslim women in South Asia (Pakistan and Bangladesh). The Crescent and the Pen described the author's journey on the trail of Taslima Nasreen, the author of the controversial novel Lajja ("Shame"), after she fled Bangladesh for Europe. Deen's 2008 book, The Jihad Seminar is about Melbourne's first religious hate speech case, (UWA Press). Ali Abdul vs The King was published in 2011 by UWA publishers. In 2013 The Crescent and the Pen was extensively rewritten and released as On the Trail of Taslim in paperback by Indian Ocean Press.

Awards and honours
Caravansserai won the New South Wales Premier's Literary Awards — Ethnic Affairs Commission Award in 1996, and The Jihad Seminar was short-listed for the 2008 Human Rights Awards — Literature Non-Fiction Award.

Publications
 Caravanserai : journey among Australian Muslims, 1995
 Broken bangles, 1998
 The crescent and the pen : the strange journey of Taslima Nasreen, 2006
 The jihād seminar, 2008
 Ali Abdul v. the king : Muslim stories from the dark days of white Australia, 2011
 On the trail of Taslima'', 2013

References

External links
 Author's website
Five generations: the story of Hanifa Deen's family  (National Archives of Australia)
 Editor of "Sultana's Dream" first online magazine produced and written by Australian Muslim women.
 Hanifa Deen on the Muslim fatigue (video)

Living people
Australian writers
Australian Muslims
Australian people of Kashmiri descent
Australian people of Punjabi descent
Australian writers of Pakistani descent
Year of birth missing (living people)